Jesús Luis Ocaña Pernía (9 June 1945 – 19 May 1994) was a Spanish road bicycle racer who won the 1973 Tour de France and the 1970 Vuelta a España. During the 1971 Tour de France he launched an amazing solo breakaway that put him into the Yellow Jersey and stunned the rest of the main field, including back to back Tour champion Eddy Merckx, but abandoned in the fourteenth stage after a crash on the descent of the Col de Menté. Ocaña would abandon as many Tours as he entered, but he finished every Vuelta a España he entered except for his first, and finished in the top 5 seven times in a row.

Career

Early years 
Ocaña was born in Priego, Cuenca, Spain but his family moved to Mont-de-Marsan (Landes,  France) in 1957. Ocaña took up racing with a club in Mont-de-Marsan and began his professional career in 1968 with the Spanish Fagor team, becoming Spanish champion that year. The following year he won the prologue and two time trials, the mountains classification as well as finishing second in the Vuelta a España.

In 1969, he won the Catalan Cycling Week. 

In 1970, Ocaña signed with the French team Bic. In the 1970 Vuelta a España, he battled with Agustín Tamames, losing the leader's jersey to him on the 13th stage. Ocaña performed well in the time-trial on the final day putting himself back into the Gold jersey as he won his first Grand Tour with an advantage of 1:18 over Tamames. The Spanish newspaper Dicen said Ocaña was "the best time-trialist that Spanish cycling has ever had". In the 1970 Tour de France, Ocaña won the stage to Puy-de-Dôme and finished 31st in the Tour.

1971 Tour de France 
Before the Tour de France, Ocaña finished third behind Eddy Merckx in Paris–Nice and second behind Merckx in the Critérium du Dauphiné Libéré. On the uphill finish of stage eight with four kilometres to go, Ocaña launched the decisive move and broke away from the favourites for that year's Tour, which included Merckx. He succeeded in a 15-second gain on Merckx but built on that the following day. Then on stage 11 to Orcières-Merlette, Ocaña rode himself into the yellow jersey with eight minutes over Merckx.

After a rest day, Merckx cut that lead to 7 minutes and in the Pyrenees, on the Col de Menté, Merckx attacked as he descended the mountain. Merckx lost control and skidded into a low wall. Ocaña could not avoid Merckx and fell himself. Merckx was up quickly and sped away. Ocaña struggled to release his cleats from the toe clips and was struck by the pursuing Joop Zoetemelk. The leader of the general classification lay on the ground screaming with pain. He was taken by helicopter to the hospital in Saint-Gaudens. He recovered but his 1971 Tour dreams had come to an end. The following day Merckx refused to wear the yellow jersey, in tribute to Ocaña. There is a memorial at the scene of the accident on the western side of the Col de Menté in the Pyrenees (at ).

The following year, 1972, Merckx had intended on not participating in the 1972 Tour de France in order to ride the Vuelta a España for the first time, but due to critics saying that Merckx only won the Tour because of Ocaña's fall, Merckx decided to ride. There was speculation of a duel. Ocaña had won the Critérium du Dauphiné Libéré and the national championship. In the Pyrenees, Ocaña repeatedly attacked Merckx without success, before withdrawing with bronchitis.

In 1973, Merckx decided to ride the Vuelta a España and Giro d'Italia. It was the first time that Merckx contested the Vuelta a España and that year he would not be contesting the Tour de France. Ocaña battled Merckx in the race with Bernard Thévenet also present. In the end Ocaña finished second, almost 4 minutes behind Merckx.

1973 Tour de France 
Because Ocaña had only finished one of the four previous editions of the Tour de France that he had started, he was not considered a favourite for overall victory. Merckx, who was not competing, had picked José Manuel Fuente, Joop Zoetemelk and Raymond Poulidor for the podium. Indeed, Zoetemelk and Poulidor had finished first and second after the prologue while Ocaña crashed during the first stage when a dog ran into the peloton. However, on the third stage, Ocaña and his team distanced his rivals. The stage began in Roubaix and when the peloton went over cobblestones at Querenaing, Ocaña and four teammates together with six others, attacked, and gained five minutes at one point, although the chasing group reduced this to two and a half minutes at the finish. However, Fuente finished seven minutes back.

Ocaña won the first mountain stage and took the yellow jersey, while Thévenet won the second mountain stage. L'Equipe newspaper predicted a duel. However, on the third mountain stage, Ocaña delivered a crushing defeat to his rivals. Fuente attacked early on the Col du Télégraphe and a group of favourites was established. On the following climb of the Col du Galibier, Ocaña led. After the descent, Ocaña and Fuente had a minute on Thévenet, while the next group were five minutes and 30 seconds behind. Fuente suffered a flat tire and Ocaña won by 52 seconds over Fuente, almost seven minutes over Thévenet & Martinez, and 20 minutes & 24 seconds over Zoetemelk, Van Impe and Poulidor. Ocaña then led the general classification by nine minutes over Fuente, ten minutes on Thevénet, with Zoetemelk fifth, over 23 minutes behind. Ocaña then won the stage 12 time trial. A duel in the Pyrenees was expected between Ocaña and Fuente but Ocaña won the longest stage in the Pyrenees. L'Equipe had the headline Ocaña appuie sur l'accélérateur translated as Ocaña steps on the accelerator. Ocaña won the last individual time trial and also the mountain stage to Puy-de-Dôme, eventually winning the race with 15 minutes over Bernard Thévenet. He also won the combativity award. After his win, Ocaña declared that after the 1974 Tour de France, he wanted to try the hour record.

Post-Tour career 
After his win in the Tour de France, Ocaña finished third and won the bronze medal in the world championship road race. He also won the Vuelta Ciclista al País Vasco in 1973 and finished fourth in the 1974 Vuelta a España, won by Fuente. Ocaña was unable to defend his Tour de France win in 1974 due to an injury sustained during the Midi-Libre. He finished fourth again in the 1975 Vuelta a España. In 1976, he was back to top form and finished third in Paris–Nice and second overall in the Vuelta a España, a minute behind José Pesarrodona.

Ocaña retired at the end of 1977 after finishing 25th in the 1975 Tour de France. He had won 110 races including nine stages of the Tour de France. He retired to his vineyard in 1977. It is said that despite their rivalry on the road, Merckx organised for a Belgian distributor to order a sizeable quantity of wine from Ocaña's ailing vineyard.

Death 
Ocaña committed suicide, in Nogaro, Gers, France by gunshot in 1994. It is said he was depressed over financial matters and was also suffering from liver cirrhosis, hepatitis C, and cancer.

Career achievements

Major results 
Source:

1965 (Independent hors catégorie)
 2nd Grand Prix de France
 5th Mont Faron hill climb
 7th Grand Prix des Nations

1966 (Independent hors catégorie)
 1st Vuelta al Bidasoa
 3rd Mont Faron hill climb
 5th Grand Prix des Nations

1967 (Independent hors catégorie)
 1st Grand Prix des Nations
 5th Mont Faron hill climb
 6th Overall Grand Prix du Midi Libre

1968
 1st  Road race, National Road Championships
 3rd Trofeo Baracchi (with Jesús Aranzabal)
 3rd Grand Prix des Nations
 3rd Overall Vuelta a Andalucía
1st Stages 1, 2 & 6
 4th Overall Volta a Catalunya
 5th À travers Lausanne

1969
 1st  Overall Setmana Catalana de Ciclisme
1st Stage 5b
 1st  Overall Grand Prix du Midi Libre
 1st Overall Vuelta a La Rioja
1st Stage 3
 2nd Overall Vuelta a España
1st Mountains classification
1st Stages 1a (ITT), 16 (ITT) & 18b
 3rd Subida a Arrate
 3rd Overall Escalada a Montjuïc
 6th Overall Tour of the Basque Country
1st Stage 3
 8th À travers Lausanne
 8th Super Prestige Pernod

1970
 1st  Overall Vuelta a España
1st Prologue (ITT) & Stage 19b (ITT)
 1st  Overall Critérium du Dauphiné Libéré
1st Stage 5b (ITT)
 1st Stage 17 Tour de France
 2nd Overall Paris–Nice
 2nd Overall Escalada a Montjuïc
 3rd Overall Setmana Catalana de Ciclisme
1st Stage 5b (ITT)
 3rd Grand Prix des Nations
 3rd Super Prestige Pernod
 7th Giro di Lombardia
 7th Subida a Arrate
 7th Overall À travers Lausanne
 7th Gran Premio di Lugano
 10th Overall Volta a Catalunya
1st Stage 7b (ITT)

1971
 1st Grand Prix des Nations
 1st  Overall Volta a Catalunya
1st Stage 5a
 1st Gran Premio di Lugano
 1st  Overall Tour of the Basque Country
1st Stage 4b (ITT)
 1st Trofeo Baracchi (with Leif Mortensen)
 1st Subida a Arrate
 1st Overall À travers Lausanne
1st mass-start stage
1st time trial stage
 2nd Overall Critérium du Dauphiné Libéré
1st Mountains classification
 3rd Overall Vuelta a España
1st Stage 12
 Tour de France
1st Stages 8 & 11
 2nd Super Prestige Pernod
 3rd Overall Paris–Nice
 3rd Overall Setmana Catalana de Ciclisme
 3rd Grand Prix de Baden-Baden (with Charly Grosskost)

1972
 1st  Road race, National Road Championships
 1st  Overall Critérium du Dauphiné Libéré
1st Mountains classification
1st Stages 4a & 5a
 2nd Overall Four Days of Dunkirk
 3rd Overall Paris–Nice
 7th Overall Grand Prix du Midi Libre
 7th Super Prestige Pernod

1973
 1st  Overall Tour de France
1st Stages 7a, 8, 12a (ITT), 13, 18 & 20a (ITT)
1st Combativity award Overall
 1st  Overall Critérium du Dauphiné Libéré
 1st Mountains classification
 1st Prologue (TTT) & Stage 6b
 1st  Overall Tour of the Basque Country
1st Stage 4b (ITT)
 1st Overall Setmana Catalana de Ciclisme
1st Stage 5a
 1st Trophée des Grimpeurs
 1st Subida a Arrate
 2nd Overall Vuelta a España
 2nd Grand Prix des Nations
 3rd Road race, UCI Road World Championships
 3rd Overall Escalada a Montjuïc
 2nd Super Prestige Pernod
 4th Overall Volta a Catalunya
1st Mountains classification
1st Stage 3b
 4th À travers Lausanne
 6th Overall Paris–Nice

1974
 3rd Overall Tour of the Basque Country
 4th Overall Vuelta a España
 4th Overall Escalada a Montjuïc
 6th Overall Critérium du Dauphiné Libéré
 6th Subida a Arrate
 7th Overall Trophée Méditerranéen
 8th Grand Prix des Nations
 10th Overall Volta a Catalunya

1975
 2nd Overall Vuelta a Andalucía
1st Stage 7a (ITT)
 2nd Overall Setmana Catalana de Ciclisme
 2nd Subida a Arrate
 3rd Overall Vuelta a Asturias
 3rd Overall Vuelta a los Valles Mineros
 4th Overall Vuelta a España
 5th Overall Vuelta a La Rioja
1st Stage 2b
 7th Overall Volta a Catalunya
 8th Overall Escalada a Montjuïc
 9th Overall Paris–Nice

1976 
 2nd Overall Vuelta a España
 3rd Overall Paris–Nice
 4th Trophée des Grimpeurs
 6th Overall Vuelta a Andalucía
 9th Overall Tour of the Basque Country
 10th Étoile des Espoirs
1st Mountains classification

1977
 1st Prologue, Tour Méditerranéen
 10th Grand Prix des Nations

Grand Tour results timeline

References

Bibliography

External links 

Spanish male cyclists
Suicides by firearm in France
Tour de France winners
Vuelta a España winners
1945 births
1994 deaths
People from Cuenca, Spain
Sportspeople from the Province of Cuenca
1994 suicides
Cyclists from Castilla-La Mancha